David Rodríguez Trueba (born 10 September 1969) is a Spanish filmmaker and author.

Biography 
David Rodríguez Trueba was born on 10 September 1969 in Madrid, the youngest of 8 siblings. His elder brother Fernando is also a filmmaker. In 1987, he joined the Complutense University of Madrid to study journalism. He later took a 1-year course on scriptwriting at the American Film Institute, where he penned the base script of The Worst Years of Our Lives. 

He is the ex-husband of actress Ariadna Gil.

He has published the novels Abierto toda la noche, Cuatro amigos and Saber perder in Anagrama.

Filmography

Film

Documentary

Television
{| class="wikitable sortable"
!Year 
!Title
!Director
!Writer
! Notes
|- 
| 1991
| ¡Felicidades, Albert!
| 
| 
| TV Special
|-
| 1993
| El Peor Programa del Mundo
| 
| 
| 5 episodes
|-
| 1995
| IX Premios Goya
| 
| 
| TV Special
|-
| 2007
| Rafael Ancona, Oficio de Guionista
| 
| 
| rowspan=2|TV Interview Movie
|-
|2009
| La Ciudad de las Palabras
|
|
|-
| 2010
| ¿Que Fue de Jorge Sanz?
| 
| 
| TV Mini-Series
|-
| 2013
| Un Lugar Llamado Mundo| 
| 
| TV Documentary Mini-Series
|-
| 2016
| ¿Que Fue de Jorge Sanz?: 5 Años Después 
| 
| 
| rowspan=2| TV Movie
|-
| 2017
| ¿Que Fue de Jorge Sanz? III| 
| 
|-
| 2022
| La Sagrada Familia| 
| 
| TV Mini-series Documentary
|}

Music Videos
Director

Bibliography
Fiction
 Abierto Toda La Noche (1995)
 Artículos de Ocasión (1998)
 Cuatro Amigos (1999)
 Saber Perder (2008)
 Blitz (2014)
 Tierra de Campos (2017)
 El Río Baja Sucio (2019)
 Queridos Niños (2021)

ArticlesArtículos de Ocasión (1998)Tragarse la Lengua y Otro Artículos de Ocasión(2003)Érase una Vez(2013)
 La Tiranía Sin Titanos (2018)El Siglo XIX Cumple 18 (2018)
 Ganarse la Vida (2020)

Political books
"Biblioteca de Ideas Insensatas"Para salvar de una vez por todas la monarquía (2015)Para salvar de una vez por todas la democracia'' (2015)

References

External links

 

1969 births
Best Director Goya Award winners
Living people
Male actors from Madrid
Male screenwriters
Spanish film directors
Spanish male film actors
Spanish male writers
20th-century Spanish screenwriters
20th-century Spanish male writers
21st-century Spanish screenwriters